Luisa Durán de la Fuente (born 27 February 1941) is the wife of the former President of Chile Ricardo Lagos. She was First Lady of Chile during her husband's tenure (2000-2006).

Personal life
Durán was born to Hernán Durán Morales and Luisa de la Fuente Tavolara. She studied at the Alliance Française school in Santiago and the Number 7 High School of Providencia.

Public life
During her time as First Lady, she preferred to be referred to as the President's wife. After the end of Lagos presidency, she was appointed executive director of the Youth and Children's Orchestras Foundation of Chile (2007-2010), and board member of Centro Cultural Matucana 100 and the Cultural Corporation of Santiago.

In 2013 she took over as director of the Corporación Cultural de Santiago.

In 2017 she returned to the public arena, regarding her spouse's presidential pre-candidacy, declaring in an interview that she had apprehensions regarding Lagos' decision, in order "not to have to be on the spot again, and to have this permanent bullying".

In October 2018 she resigned from the Party for Democracy.

References

External links

Chilean people of Italian descent
Chilean agnostics
First ladies of Chile
Living people
People from Santiago
1941 births
Dames Grand Cross of the Order of Isabella the Catholic